Inkaba is a genus of sea snails, marine gastropod mollusks in the family Trochidae, the top snails.

Species
Species within the genus Inkaba include:
 Inkaba tonga Herbert, 1992

References

External links
 To World Register of Marine Species

 
Trochidae
Monotypic gastropod genera